The Federação Pernambucana de Futebol, once named Liga Esportiva Pernambucana, also known by the acronym FPF, organizes and administrates the Campeonato Pernambucano, the Copa Pernambuco, the Campeonato Pernambucano Série A2 and the Campeonato Pernambucano Série A3). It was founded in 1915. Carlos Alberto Oliveira was the president of FPF until his death on August 29, 2011 being replaced by Evandro Carvalho.

History
The original founders of the Federation were:
 América (previously known as João de Barros Futebol Clube)
 Centro Sportivo do Peres
 Flamengo (Recife)
 Santa Cruz
 Torre (previously known as Agros Sport Club de Socorro)

The following clubs also share the status of founders:

 Sport Club do Recife, 
 Clube Náutico Capibaribe, 
 Ferroviário Esporte Clube do Recife (previously known as Associação Atlética Great-Western, currently known as  Clube Ferroviário do Recife), 
 Íbis Sport Club,  and
 Auto Esporte Clube.

In the Founding Assembly the following sport leagues were present:

 Olindense de Desportos, 
 Desportiva Caruaruense, 
 Desportiva Garanhuense, and
 Desportiva de Pesqueira.

Presidents
Liga Sportiva Pernambucana
Aristeu Acioli Lins – 1915
Alcebíades Braga – 1915
Henrique Jacques – 1915
Melchior do Amaral – 1915 – 1917
Liga Pernambucana de Desportos Terrestre
Manoel da Silva Guimarães – 1918 – 1919
João Reinaldo da Costa Lima – 1919 – 1920
João Duarte Dias – 1920
Loyo Neto – 1920 – 1921
Artur Campelo – 1922 – 1924
Cícero Brasileiro de Melo – 1925 – 1926
Júlio de Melo Filho – 1926 – 1927
Renato Silveira – 1927 – 1928 – 1929 – 1930
Maviael do Prado – 1928
Carlos Rios – 1929 – 1930
Federação Pernambucana de Desportos
Maviael do Prado – 1930 – 1935
Sebastião Maciel – 1936 – 1937
Edgar Moury Fernandes – 1938
Tavares Buril – 1938 – 1939 – 1940 – 1941
Sidrack Correia de Oliveira – 1940
Alfredo Ramos – 1941 – 1943
Edson Moury Fernandes – 1943 – 1945
Nilo de Brito Bastos – 1946 – 1947
Osvaldo Salsa – 1947
Leopoldo Casado – 1947 – 1948
José Rêgo Vieria – 1949 – 1950
Sigismundo Cabral de Melo – 1951 – 1953
Évio de Abreu e Lima – 1953 – 1954
Federação Pernambucana de Futebol
Rubem Rodriges Moreira – 1954 – 1982
Dilson Prado Cavalcanti – 1982 – 1985
Carlos Frederico Gomes de Oliveira – 1985 – 1995
Carlos Alberto Gomes de Oliveira – 1995 – 2011
Evandro Barros Carvalho – 2011 –

Current clubs

2023

State leagues

Other competitions

2022

Brasileirão

Brasileirão feminino

State leagues

References

External links 
Federação Pernambucana de Futebol - Official site of the federation.

Pernambuco